Costa del Sol Occidental (English: "Western Coast of the Sun") is a comarca (county) in Andalusia,  southern Spain.

It occupies a narrow coastal strip delimited by the cordillera Penibética (Sierra de Mijas, Sierra Alpujata, Sierra Blanca, Sierra Bermeja, Sierra Crestallina) to the north and the Mediterranean Sea to the south. The coast shows a diversity of landscapes: beaches, cliffs, estuaries, bays and dunes. The rivers are short and seasonal, while the agriculture is hampered by the lee effect caused by the Baetic System.

Municipalities
There are 9 municipalities, running along this coast, and listed below from west to east:

See also
Baetic System
Costa del Sol

References

Comarcas of Andalusia
Geography of the Province of Málaga